A palace museum refers a number of museums that are housed in former royal palaces. 

 In Mainland China 
 The Palace Museum, housed in the Forbidden City in Beijing.
The Kulangsu Gallery of Foreign Artifacts from the Palace Museum Collection in Kulangsu, Xiamen.
The Shenyang Imperial Palace Museum in Shenyang, Liaoning.
 In Hong Kong
The Hong Kong Palace Museum, a public museum exhibiting artefacts of the Beijing's Palace Museum in West Kowloon.
 In Taiwan
The National Palace Museum, formerly housed in the Forbidden City, now sits in Taipei and houses part of its former collection.
The Southern Branch of the National Palace Museum in Chiayi.
 In other regions
 The National Palace Museum of Korea, repository of royal heritage in Seoul, South Korea.
 The Topkapı Palace Museum in Istanbul, Turkey.
 The Red Fort Archaeological Museum in Delhi, India, known as Palace Museum during the British rule. 
 The Malacca Sultanate Palace Museum, an example of a palace that was reconstructed to function as a museum, in Malacca, Malaysia 

Many former royal palaces house museums; these include. 
 The Palace of Versailles near Paris
 The Winter Palace in St Petersburg
 The Royal Palace, Luang Prabang
 The Royal Palace, Porto-Novo
 The Museum of King John III's Palace at Wilanów in Warsaw

See also
 Royal Palace Museum (disambiguation)

References

Types of museums
Palace Museum
Lists of museums by subject
Former palaces